86th parallel may refer to:

86th parallel north, a circle of latitude in the Northern Hemisphere, in the Arctic Ocean
86th parallel south, a circle of latitude in the Southern Hemisphere, in Antarctica